HTZ may refer to:
 CHTZ-FM, a radio station licensed to St. Catherines, Ontario, Canada
 Croatian National Tourist Board
 Hathidah railway station, in Bihar, India
 The Hertz Corporation, an American car rental company